Ricardo José Dognella Lima de Oliveira (born 6 May 1980) is a Brazilian professional footballer who plays as a striker for Athletic.

He represented São Paulo and Santos in two different spells, but also played in Spain, amassing La Liga totals of 120 games and 58 goals for three teams.

A Brazil international from 2004 to 2016, Oliveira helped the national team win one Copa América and one Confederations Cup.

Club career

Portuguesa
Born in São Paulo, Oliveira joined Corinthians' youth setup in 1997. After being released by the club in 1999, he moved to Portuguesa, being promoted to the first team in the following year.

Oliveira made his professional debut on 24 September 2000, coming on as a second-half substitute and scoring the game's only in a Copa João Havelange home win against Sport Club do Recife. He scored 23 goals over the course of three seasons in the Série A and, in March 2001, equalled a club record by netting in seven consecutive matches.

Santos
In early 2003, Oliveira moved to Santos, although this was disputed in a sports court. He scored in the group and knockout stages of the 2003 Copa Libertadores, and he appeared in both legs of the final, although his team lost to Boca Juniors.

Valencia
On 31 July 2003, Oliveira moved to Spain and joined Valencia CF, signing a five-year contract with Santos retaining part-ownership. Under the guidance of Rafael Benítez he scored eight La Liga goals in 21 games, including a fantastic long-range effort at FC Barcelona in a 1–0 win in October, netting a hat-trick the following month at RCD Mallorca (5–0 victory).

The Che were eventually crowned national champions, adding that season's UEFA Cup.

Betis
However, after only one season, Oliveira joined Real Betis for a reported fee of €4 million. He scored a career-best 22 league goals in 37 appearances as the club reached the UEFA Champions League for the first time ever after finishing fourth, and also won the season's Copa del Rey against CA Osasuna, with the player netting the first in a 2–1 extra time win.

Oliveira scored his first official Champions League goal on 28 September 2005 at R.S.C. Anderlecht, following a brace – including a solo effort – against AS Monaco in the third qualifying round. Due to knee ligament damage sustained against Chelsea on 1 November 2005, he only played nine times in the league, although he netted four times.

Oliveira moved on loan to São Paulo in early 2006, in a bid to gain a place in Brazil's 2006 World Cup squad – prolonged recovery time meant he never made it but he did continue to compete for the club in all the fronts until 10 August 2006. Previously, in August 2005, he had threatened with leaving the Verdiblancos over economic issues.

Oliveira returned to Betis on 21 August following his loan spell, nine days later than he was requested, which caused controversy among the club's board of directors. The delay was caused by an unplanned schedule change made by CONMEBOL, which postponed the Libertadores final match in one week, and his contract was due on the day after the previous final match date; he wanted to play on the decisive match and tried to reach an agreement with the Andalusians, even with a special allowance from FIFA, but the Spanish team would not cooperate and he was not able to take part in the game.

Milan

The Serie A giants had just lost Andriy Shevchenko after the 2006 Italian football scandal, and signed Oliveira as his replacement on 31 August 2006, to a five-year deal. Johann Vogel moved in the opposite position as part of the deal after the two clubs negotiated nearly a week over the transfer fee, which reportedly reached €17.5 million.

Oliveira made his debut in the second half of the 2006–07 opening-day match against S.S. Lazio, heading past Angelo Peruzzi from the goalline in a 2–1 home win. However, he scored only twice more after that for the Rossoneri in the league, adding two more in their run in the Coppa Italia; he spent most of the season under the stress of the October 2006 kidnapping of his sister, Maria Lourdes, who was released unharmed on 12 March 2007.

Zaragoza
On 14 July 2007, Oliveira moved back to Spain and joined Real Zaragoza on loan, forming an impressive striker partnership with Argentine Diego Milito as the two scored 33 of the side's 50 goals during the campaign, which nonetheless ended in relegation. The Aragonese would have an option to purchase him for an agreed price when the loan period finished.

On 25 May 2008, Zaragoza bought Oliveira from Milan for a reported €10 million.

Betis return
However, in late January 2009, Oliveira re-joined Betis on a fee of €8.9 million with commission, signing until June 2013. He scored in the 83rd minute of his very first appearance, netting the second goal in the derby against Sevilla FC on 7 February, a 2–1 win at the Ramón Sánchez Pizjuán Stadium.

Betis would be eventually relegated, as both Oliveira (who struck in the last match, a 1–1 home draw with Real Valladolid) and former Zaragoza teammate Sergio García met the same fate for the second consecutive year.

Al-Jazira
In mid-July 2009 Oliveira, already immersed in pre-season with Betis, left for Al Jazira Club in a lucrative deal of about €14 million. In January of the following year, he returned to his country and São Paulo on loan.

In Al Jazira's opening match of the 2012 AFC Champions League, Oliveira scored his side's last goal in a 4–2 defeat of FC Nasaf on 7 March 2012, netting three against the same opponent on 2 May (4–1 victory). Two weeks later, he scored all of his team's goals against Al-Rayyan SC in a 4–3 win at the Ahmed Bin Ali Stadium in Doha.

In the competition's round of 16 clash against Al-Ahli, Oliveira netted twice in a 3–3 draw, but missed his shootout attempt to see his team be eliminated 2–4. In late January 2014, following the arrivals of Felipe Caicedo and Jucilei, he was released.

Return to Santos
On 12 January 2015, Oliveira returned to Santos after agreeing to a five-month deal. He played his first match after his return on 1 February, coming on as a second-half substitute for Geuvânio in a 3–0 home win over Ituano.

On 1 May 2015, after being the club's top goalscorer in that year's Campeonato Paulista – also being elected the best player of the competition – Oliveira extended his contract until December 2017. In the subsequent Brasileirão, he also scored braces against his former club São Paulo (2–3 away defeat) and Chapecoense (3–1 home win), again leading the charts with 20 goals.

Oliveira scored the decisive goal in 2016 Campeonato Paulista final against Audax on 8 May. He later revealed playing the match with a knee injury, which subsequently kept him sidelined for two months. On 27 July, he netted a hat-trick in a 3–0 home win over Gama for the Copa do Brasil.

After a 2017 campaign marked by injuries, Oliveira still managed to score nine times in the league as his side finished third. On 20 December, after failing to agree new terms, he left the club.

Atlético Mineiro
A day after announcing his departure from Santos, 37-year-old Oliveira agreed to a two-year deal with fellow league team Atlético Mineiro. In September 2020, he officially left the club after alleging upaid wages and leaving back in June.

Coritiba
On 29 September 2020, aged 40, Oliveira was announced at Coritiba still in the top tier.

International career
Oliveira made his debut for the Brazil national team against the Catalan XI on 25 May 2004, scoring in a 5–1 win. However, the game was not considered an official friendly match by FIFA.

He was subsequently included in the squad for the 2004 Copa América, winning his first cap on 8 July 2004 against Paraguay. During the event he also scored his first international goal, in the quarter-final match against Mexico on the 18th, as Brazil went on to win the cup.

Subsequently, Oliveira became a regular as a cover for Adriano, Robinho and Ronaldo. He was also included in the squad for the 2005 FIFA Confederations Cup, only missing out on the 2006 FIFA World Cup due to injury with Betis.

After a one-year absence from the national team, new national coach Dunga recalled Oliveira for a friendly match with Switzerland on 15 November 2006. On 24 September 2015, exactly 15 years after his professional debut and eight after his last cap, he was called up as a replacement to injured Roberto Firmino for the first two matches of the 2018 World Cup qualification campaign against Chile and Venezuela, starting in the latter and scoring his side's last in a 3–1 win in Fortaleza.

Oliveira scored again on 29 March 2016, netting his side's first in a 2–2 2018 World Cup qualification draw with Paraguay. On 5 May he was named among the 23-man list for the Copa América Centenario to be held in the United States, but was replaced by Jonas on 21 May due to injury.

Career statistics

Club

International

International goals
 (Brazil score listed first, score column indicates score after each Oliveira goal)

Honours

Club
Valencia
La Liga: 2003–04
UEFA Cup: 2003–04

Betis
Copa del Rey: 2004–05

São Paulo
Campeonato Brasileiro Série A: 2006

Milan
UEFA Champions League: 2006–07

Al Jazira
UAE Pro-League: 2010–11
Etisalat Emirates Cup: 2009–10
UAE President's Cup: 2010–11, 2011–12

Santos
Campeonato Paulista: 2015, 2016

International
Brazil
Copa América: 2004
FIFA Confederations Cup: 2005

Individual
Campeonato Paulista Team of the Year: 2015
Campeonato Paulista Best Player: 2015
Chuteira de Ouro: 2015
Campeonato Brasileiro Série A Team of the Year: 2015
Campeonato Brasileiro Série A Top Goalscorer: 2015

See also
Fastest goals in association football

References

External links

1980 births
Living people
Footballers from São Paulo
Brazilian footballers
Association football forwards
Campeonato Brasileiro Série A players
Associação Portuguesa de Desportos players
Santos FC players
São Paulo FC players
Clube Atlético Mineiro players
Coritiba Foot Ball Club players
La Liga players
Segunda División players
Valencia CF players
UEFA Cup winning players
Real Betis players
Real Zaragoza players
Serie A players
A.C. Milan players
UAE Pro League players
Al Jazira Club players
Al-Wasl F.C. players
UEFA Champions League winning players
Brazil international footballers
2004 Copa América players
2005 FIFA Confederations Cup players
Copa América-winning players
FIFA Confederations Cup-winning players
Brazilian expatriate footballers
Expatriate footballers in Spain
Expatriate footballers in Italy
Expatriate footballers in the United Arab Emirates
Brazilian expatriate sportspeople in Spain
Brazilian expatriate sportspeople in Italy
Brazilian expatriate sportspeople in the United Arab Emirates